Ippo Yamada (山田一法 Yamada Ippō) is a video game music composer. He has contributed music to such titles as Mega Man Zero (2002), Mega Man ZX (2006), Mega Man 9 (2008), and Azure Striker Gunvolt (2014). He is a founding member of Inti Creates, a Japanese video game development company formed by ex-Capcom staff in May 1996.

Works

References

External links
Inti Creates 

20th-century births
Year of birth missing (living people)
Capcom people
Japanese composers
Japanese male composers
Japanese male musicians
Living people
Musicians from Kanagawa Prefecture
People from Kanagawa Prefecture
Video game composers